Chad Harpur (born 3 September 1982) is a South African former professional footballer who played as a goalkeeper.

Career
Harpur played for Molesey in 2001, receiving an injury on his debut. He also played in England for Basingstoke Town, Millwall and Leeds United.

After a spell in South Africa with Maritzburg Classic and Manning Rangers, Harpur spent the 2006–07 season with Dundee in Scotland, making one league appearance. He spent the next season with Kilmarnock, leaving the club in 2009.

Harpur also played in South Africa for Manning Rangers, Ajax Cape Town and Mpumalanga Black Aces; he retired from playing in 2012, taking a sporting director role at La Manga Club in Spain.

References

1982 births
Living people
Soccer players from Johannesburg
Association football goalkeepers
South African soccer players
South African expatriate soccer players
Molesey F.C. players
Basingstoke Town F.C. players
Millwall F.C. players
Leeds United F.C. players
Maritzburg United F.C. players
Dundee F.C. players
Kilmarnock F.C. players
Manning Rangers F.C. players
Cape Town Spurs F.C. players
Mpumalanga Black Aces F.C. players
Scottish Premier League players
Expatriate footballers in England
South African expatriate sportspeople in England
Expatriate footballers in Scotland
South African expatriate sportspeople in Scotland